John of Naples may refer to:

People from Naples
John the Deacon (Neapolitan historian), fl. 9th century
Giovanni Gaderisi (cardinal), fl. 12th century
John of Naples (died c. 1350), Dominican theologian
Giovanni Cataldi (died c. 1465), Dominican theologian
Giovanni d'Aragona (cardinal), fl. 15th century

Dukes of Naples
John of Conza (c. 616)
John I (711–719)
John II (–919)
John III (928–968/969)
John IV (997/999–1005)
John V (1033–1050)
John VI (1090–1122)

Bishops of Naples
John I (d. 432)
John II (6th century)
John III (7th century)
John IV (842–849)
John V (fl. 1033)
John VI (fl. 1065–1071)
Giovanni Orsini	(1328–1359)
Giovanni Bozzuto (1407–1415)